Brisbane Quarter  (also known as 300 George Street) is a development consisting of three buildings; residential apartments, an office tower and hotel tower, on the old Law Courts site bordered by George, Adelaide and Ann streets and North Quay in Brisbane, Australia.

The proposed development includes:

 The One (Tower 1) , 82-storey residential tower on the corner of North Quay and Adelaide Street. The tower, designed by Zenx Architects, will include 467 apartments. It is Brisbane's second–tallest building;
 W Brisbane Hotel (Tower 2) , 34-storey hotel tower on the corner of Ann Street and North Quay. The tower, designed by DBI Architects, is occupied by five-star W Hotels and includes 312 hotel rooms, presidential & executive suites, health spa with pools. W Brisbane opened in June 2018;
 300 George (Tower 3) , 41-storey office tower on the corner of George and Ann streets. The tower, designed by Zenx Architects, consists of  58,209m2 of office space. 300 George opened in October 2019.

A retail shopping mall, that will include a master ballroom, conference facilities and retail stores is proposed underneath the towers on the first three floors.

The former Law Courts site was purchased by the Shayher Group, part of the Taiwan-based developer Par Jar Group in May 2013.
The development application was lodged with the Brisbane City Council in November and approved in December 2013.

Demolition of the old court buildings commenced in early 2014, and construction works commenced in 2015.

See also

List of tallest buildings in Brisbane

References

External links 
Building at The Skyscraper Center database
W Brisbane at Starwood Hotels website
300 George Street Blogumentary Project

Proposed skyscrapers in Australia
Residential skyscrapers in Australia
Proposed hotels
George Street, Brisbane
Skyscraper hotels in Australia
Skyscraper office buildings in Australia
Shopping centres in Queensland
Buildings and structures completed in 2021